The nineteenth edition of the Caribbean Series (Serie del Caribe) was played in . It was held from February 4 through February 9 with the champions teams from the Dominican Republic, Águilas Cibaeñas; Mexico, Naranjeros de Hermosillo; Puerto Rico, Vaqueros de Bayamón and Venezuela, Tigres de Aragua. The format consisted of 12 games, each team facing the other teams twice, and was played in Dominican Republic. For the first time in Series history, the games were played at two different venues, the Estadio Quisqueya in Santo Domingo and the Estadio Cibao in Santiago de los Caballeros.

Summary
The Naranjeros de Hermosillo gave Mexico its first Caribbean Series championship title. Managed by legendary Cananea Reyes, the team outscored their opponents 36 to 18 over the six-day tournament in Dominican Republic, winning five consecutive games to pull an upset in the opener and prevailing behind their fine pitching, which gave up just 16 earned runs in 57 innings (2.53). Rich Hinton (seven-hit shutout) and George Brunet (1-0, 1.50) each turned fine performances, while 1B Héctor Espino, OF Jerry Hairston, 3B Celerino Sánchez and 2B Bump Wills paced the hitting attack. Also in the roster were C Sergio Robles, SS Eddie Leon, OFs Arnoldo de Hoyos and Chet Lemon, and Ps Ed Acosta, Francisco Barrios and Vicente Romo. Espino was named the Most Valuable Player, while the team had six players in the All-Star team.

Managed by Ozzie Virgil, the Tigres de Aragua of the Venezuelan league won its first two games, but they went 1-3 the rest of the way and had to settle for second place.  Four hitters carried much of the offensive weight: CF Enos Cabell (.400, best average in the Series; seven RBI), RF Terry Whitfield (.375, eight runs, five RBI), 3B Manny Trillo (.333) and 2B Duane Kuiper (.320). Their best pitcher was Mark Wiley, who posted a 2-0 record and a 2.04 ERA, while Manny Sarmiento (1-0, one save) and Aurelio Monteagudo did the job out of the bullpen. The team also featured 1B Tim Hosley, SS Dave Concepción, and Ps Bill Campbell, Roberto Muñoz and Willie Prall.

The Dominican Republic team, with Tim Murtaugh at the helm, disappointed their home fans after going 2-4 to finish in third place. The Águilas Cibaeñas, who had won their second title in a row, usually put players on the bases but lacked the necessary clutch hitting to bring them home. OFs Miguel Diloné and César Gerónimo provided good defense and speed on the bases, while 3B Winston Llenas and 1B/C Bill Nahorodny smashed the only home runs for the team. Besides this, their most effective starters in ERA had losing records: Rick Waits (0-1, 2.13) and Rick Langford (0-1, 3.00), while starter Jerry Augustine (6.00 ERA) and reliever Kent Tekulve (11.59 ERA) delivered the only wins for Dominican Republic. Other members of the team included Ps Tom Dettore, Nino Espinosa and Juan Jiménez; C Ed Ott, 2B Bob Sheldon, SS Frank Taveras, OF Morris Nettles, and DH Manny Mota.

The favored reigning champion, Vaqueros de Bayamón, tied for third with a 2-4 record. One victory came from Juan Pizarro, who hurled a three-hit shutout in Game 7. The Puerto Rico team, piloted by José Pagán, scored the fewest runs (23) and committed the most errors (15) in the Series. Inexplicably, the anemic Boricua offense combined for a paltry .246 average, even though the team had a solid lineup that included 1B Dan Driessen, Of Ken Griffey, Sr., 3B Art Howe, SS Iván de Jesús, C Ellie Rodríguez and the outfield brothers, Héctor and José Cruz among others.

Scoreboards

Game 1, February 4

Game 2, February 4

Game 3, February 5

Game 4, February 5

Game 5, February 6

Game 6, February 6

Game 7, February 7

Game 8, February 7

Game 9, February 8

Game 10, February 8

Game 11, February 9

Game 12, February 9

Sources
Antero Núñez, José. Series del Caribe. Impresos Urbina, Caracas, Venezuela.
Araujo Bojórquez, Alfonso. Series del Caribe: Narraciones y estadísticas, 1949-2001. Colegio de Bachilleres del Estado de Sinaloa, Mexico.
Figueredo, Jorge S. Cuban Baseball: A Statistical History, 1878–1961. Macfarland & Co., United States.
González Echevarría, Roberto. The Pride of Havana. Oxford University Express.
Gutiérrez, Daniel. Enciclopedia del Béisbol en Venezuela, Caracas, Venezuela.

External links
Las Series del Caribe (Spanish)
La Semana Deportiva – Estadísticas de la Serie del Caribe 1975 (Spanish)

Caribbean
Caribbean Series
International baseball competitions hosted by the Dominican Republic
1976 in Dominican Republic sport
Sports competitions in Santo Domingo
20th century in Santo Domingo
Caribbean Series